Marianna Auenbrugger (19 July 1759 – 25 August 1782) was an Austrian pianist and composer.

Biography
Born in Vienna, Auenbrugger was the daughter of the physician Leopold Auenbrugger. She was a highly regarded pianist and composer in Vienna. Together with her sister Caterina Franziska, she was a student of Joseph Haydn and Antonio Salieri. In 1780, Haydn dedicated a cycle of six sonatas to the two sisters (Hob XVI :35-39 and 20).

When Marianne died in 1782, Salieri, at his own expense, published her Keyboard Sonata in E-flat together with his own funeral Ode De si piacevoli.

External links
 

1759 births
1782 deaths
18th-century Austrian musicians
18th-century Austrian women
18th-century Austrian women writers
18th-century Austrian writers
18th-century classical composers
18th-century keyboardists
Austrian classical composers
Austrian classical pianists
Austrian women composers
Austrian women pianists
Musicians from Vienna
Pupils of Antonio Salieri
Pupils of Joseph Haydn
Women classical pianists